Chute Forest is a village and civil parish in east Wiltshire, England. The parish is bordered to the east and south by the county of Hampshire.

History 
The area was a large royal forest by the 13th century and continued in Crown ownership until 1639. It was then an extra-parochial area until it became a civil parish in the 19th century, and an ecclesiastical parish in 1875 after the church was built.

The Chute Hoard 
A hoard of Iron Age coins found in the northeast in 1927 (with further coins found in 1986 and 1994) is the only evidence of prehistoric activity in the parish. The coins are from the 1st century BC. The British Museum holds 36 coins while the Wiltshire Museum at Devizes has others, together with the hollow flint nodule in which they were found.

Chute Lodge 
Chute Lodge, in the centre of the parish, is a country house built in red brick in 1768 by Sir Robert Taylor, on or near the site of an earlier house. In 1988 the house was designated as Grade I listed.

Parish church

St Mary's Church, 600 metres north of Chute Lodge, was built between 1870 and 1871 to designs by J.L. Pearson and consecrated in 1875. It has been designated as a Grade II* listed building and is now in the care of the Churches Conservation Trust.

Local government
Chute Forest is a civil parish with an elected parish council. It is in the area of Wiltshire Council unitary authority, which is responsible for almost all significant local government functions.

References

External links
 

Villages in Wiltshire
Civil parishes in Wiltshire